Vortech, Inc. is an American aircraft manufacturer based in Fallston, Maryland. The company specializes in the design and manufacture of rotorcraft in the form of plans and kits for amateur construction. Some of their designs also comply with the US FAR 103 Ultralight Vehicles rules as well.

Founded in 1970, Vortech and its parent company, Prismz, provide plans, books, some kits and parts to enable hobbyists to construct a wide array of machines, including: helicopters, autogyros, mini-cars, trikes, scooters, wind generators, engines, boats and electroplating systems. Prismz also provides computer graphics and publishing layout services.

Vortech also manufactures its own line of helicopter rotor blades made from single-piece metal extrusions.

Aircraft

References

External links

Aircraft manufacturers of the United States
Ultralight aircraft
Homebuilt aircraft
Helicopters
Autogyros